Mian Yili (also Romanized as Mīān Yīlī; also known as Mīyānpulī) is a village in Rudkhaneh Bar Rural District, Rudkhaneh District, Rudan County, Hormozgan Province, Iran. At the 2006 census, its population was 48, in 11 families.

References 

Populated places in Rudan County